The Bazavluk is a river in Ukraine and a right tributary of the Dnieper. It is shallow and dries up frequently.

References

Rivers of Dnipropetrovsk Oblast